Eulogio Génova Emezabal (born 4 October 1960) is a Spanish lightweight rower. He won a gold medal at the 1983 World Rowing Championships in Duisburg with the lightweight men's eight.

References

1960 births
Living people
Spanish male rowers
World Rowing Championships medalists for Spain
20th-century Spanish people
21st-century Spanish people